The 2018 All-SEC football team consists of American football players selected to the All-Southeastern Conference (SEC) chosen by the Associated Press (AP) and the conference coaches for the 2018 Southeastern Conference football season.

Alabama won the conference, beating Georgia 35–28 in the SEC Championship.

Alabama quarterback Tua Tagovailoa was voted the AP SEC Offensive Player of the Year. Kentucky linebacker Josh Allen was voted the AP SEC Defensive Player of the Year.

Offensive selections

Quarterbacks
Tua Tagovailoa, Alabama (AP-1, Coaches-1)
Drew Lock, Missouri (AP-2, Coaches-2)

Running backs
Benny Snell , Kentucky (AP-1, Coaches-1)
Trayveon Williams, Texas A&M (AP-1, Coaches-1)
D'Andre Swift, Georgia (AP-2, Coaches-2)
Damien Harris, Alabama (Coaches-2)
Ke'Shawn Vaughn, Vanderbilt (AP-2)

Wide receivers
A. J. Brown, Ole Miss (AP-1, Coaches-1)
Jerry Jeudy, Alabama (AP-1, Coaches-1)
Deebo Samuel, South Carolina (AP-2, Coaches-2)
Emanuel Hall, Missouri (Coaches-2)
Kalija Lipscomb, Vanderbilt (AP-2)

Centers
Lamont Gaillard, Georgia (AP-2, Coaches-1)
Ross Pierschbacher, Alabama (AP-1, Coaches-2)

Guards
Bunchy Stallings, Kentucky (AP-1, Coaches-1)
Tre'Vour Wallace-Simms, Missouri (AP-1)
Zack Bailey, South Carolina (AP-2, Coaches-2)
Hjalte Froholdt, Arkansas (AP-2)
Deion Calhoun, Miss St (Coaches-2)

Tackles
Greg Little, Ole Miss (AP-1, Coaches-1)
Jonah Williams, Alabama (AP-1, Coaches-1)
Andrew Thomas, Georgia (AP-2, Coaches-1)
Martez Ivey, Florida (AP-2, Coaches-2)
Alex Leatherwood, Alabama (Coaches-2)

Tight ends
Jace Sternberger, Texas A&M (AP-1, Coaches-1)
Irv Smith Jr., Alabama (AP-2)
Jared Pinkney, Vanderbilt (Coaches-2)

Defensive selections

Defensive ends
Jachai Polite, Florida (AP-1, Coaches-1)
Montez Sweat, Miss St (AP-1, Coaches-1)
Isaiah Buggs, Alabama (AP-2, Coaches-2)
Raekwon Davis, Alabama (AP-2)
Jonathan Ledbetter, Georgia (Coaches-2)

Defensive tackles
Jeffery Simmons, Miss St (AP-1, Coaches-1)
Quinnen Williams, Alabama (AP-1, Coaches-1)
Derrick Brown, Auburn (AP-2, Coaches-2)
Terry Beckner Jr., Missouri (AP-2, Coaches-2)

Linebackers
Josh Allen, Kentucky (AP-1, Coaches-1)
Deshaun Davis, Auburn (AP-1, Coaches-1)
Devin White, LSU (AP-1, Coaches-1)
Cale Garrett, Missouri (Coaches-2)
De'Jon Harris, Arkansas (AP-2)
Dylan Moses, Alabama (Coaches-2)
Erroll Thompson, Miss St (AP-2)
D'Andre Walker, Georgia (AP-2)
Mack Wilson, Alabama (Coaches-2)

Cornerbacks
Deandre Baker, Georgia (AP-1, Coaches-1)
Greedy Williams, LSU (AP-1, Coaches-1)
Cameron Dantzler, Miss St (AP-2)
Joejuan Williams, Vanderbilt (AP-2, Coaches-2)
C. J. Henderson, Florida (Coaches-2)

Safeties
Grant Delpit, LSU (AP-1, Coaches-1)
Johnathan Abram, Miss St (AP-1, Coaches-2)
Mike Edwards, Kentucky (AP-2)
Deionte Thompson, Alabama (AP-2, Coaches-1)
DeMarkus Acy, Missouri (Coaches-2)

Special teams

Kickers
Cole Tracy, LSU (AP-1, Coaches-1)
Rodrigo Blankenship, Georgia (AP-2, Coaches-2)

Punters

Braden Mann, Texas A&M (AP-1, Coaches-1)
Zach Von Rosenberg, LSU (AP-2)
Joseph Charlton, South Carolina (Coaches-2)

All purpose/return specialist
Deebo Samuel, South Carolina (AP-1, Coaches-1)
Mecole Hardman, Georgia (AP-2)
Lynn Bowden, Kentucky (Coaches-2)

Key

See also
2018 Southeastern Conference football season
2018 College Football All-America Team

References

All-Southeastern Conference
All-SEC football teams